Kurokui Dam is an earthfill dam located in Yamaguchi prefecture in Japan. The dam is used for water supply. The catchment area of the dam is 3.2 km2. The dam impounds about 6  ha of land when full and can store 246 thousand cubic meters of water. The construction of the dam was completed in 1939.

References

Dams in Yamaguchi Prefecture
1939 establishments in Japan